Kuramalu (also Romanized as Kūrāmālū) is a village in Angut-e Sharqi Rural District, Anguti District, Germi County, Ardabil Province, Iran. At the 2006 census, its population was 583, in 114 families.

References 

Tageo

Towns and villages in Germi County